Yedashe Township is a township of Taungoo District in Bago Region, Myanmar. The principal town is Yedashe.

References

Townships of the Bago Region
Taungoo District